Hitman 47 may refer to several properties in the Hitman (franchise):

 Agent 47, the main character, a hitman
 Hitman: Agent 47, a 2016 film in the franchise
 Hitman: Codename 47, a 2000 videogame in the franchise

See also
 Hitman (disambiguation)
 47 (disambiguation)